X-COM: UFO Defense (known as UFO: Enemy Unknown in Europe) is a 1994 science fiction strategy video game developed by Mythos Games. It was published by MicroProse for DOS and Amiga computers, the Amiga CD32 console, and the PlayStation.

Originally planned by Julian Gollop as a sequel to Mythos Games' 1988 Laser Squad, the game mixes real-time management simulation with turn-based tactics. The player takes the role of commander of X-COM – an international paramilitary organization secretly defending Earth from an alien invasion. Through the game, the player is tasked with issuing orders to individual X-COM troops in a series of turn-based tactical missions. At strategic scale, the player directs the research and development of new technologies, builds and expands X-COM's bases, manages the organization's finances and personnel, and monitors and responds to UFO activity.

The game received strong reviews and was commercially successful, acquiring a cult following among strategy fans; several publications have listed X-COM: UFO Defense as one of the best video games ever made, including IGN ranking it as the best PC game of all time in 2007. It was the first and best-received entry in the X-COM series and has directly inspired several similar games, including UFO: Alien Invasion, UFO: Extraterrestrials and Xenonauts. An official remake of the game, XCOM: Enemy Unknown, was created by Firaxis Games and published by 2K Games in 2012. Mythos Games' and Julian Gollop's own original spiritual successor project, The Dreamland Chronicles: Freedom Ridge, was cancelled in 2001 and later partially turned into UFO: Aftermath by another developer. Gollop's new X-COM spiritual successor project, Phoenix Point, was released in 2019.

Plot
The story of X-COM, set in the near-future at the time of the game's release, begins in the year 1998. The initial plot centers on increased reports of UFO sightings as tales of abductions and rumors of attacks by mysterious aliens become widespread. The nations of the world come to perceive this as a threat and attempt to form their own forces – such as Japan's Kiryu-Kai force – to deal with the crisis, but these efforts are unsuccessful. On December 11, 1998, representatives from some of the most powerful nations in the world secretly meet in Geneva to discuss the issue. From this meeting is born the clandestine defense and research organization Extraterrestrial Combat (X-COM), over which the player assumes control at the start of the game.

In the beginning, the player will only have access to conventional weapons, but as the game progresses, the player learns more about the enemy, their species, mutated creations, and technology. It is ultimately revealed that the "leaders" behind the alien invasion are a race known as Ethereals which possess powerful mind control abilities and enslave other races of aliens to perform their bidding and that their main base in the Solar System is located in Cydonia region of Mars. The player must then prepare the final assault team, attack Cydonia and destroy the mastermind behind the alien invasion, the biocomputer Alien Brain.

The game may end in several ways. If the player's performance is poor or worse for two consecutive months, the player runs a deep deficit for two consecutive months, all the player's bases are captured, or the player mounts an assault on the aliens' Mars base and loses, the game ends in defeat, where in the PlayStation version, the council of funding nations makes a futile attempt to negotiate with the aliens, who violently murder the negotiator. While in the MS-DOS version, the funding nations sign pacts with the aliens promising peace, but they instead destroy every city and poison the water and air to destroy any resistance, the remaining survivors are put in slave camps to help terraform Earth for future alien colonization. If, however, the player is victorious in the final attack, the game ends in mankind's victory.

Gameplay
The game takes place within two distinct views, called the Geoscape and the Battlescape. According to GameSpy, "Playing it again in 2012, it comes off as both completely brilliant and slightly insane. In effect, X-COM melds an SSI Gold Box RPG with a highly detailed 4X game like Master of Orion, making it in some ways two entirely different games."

Geoscape

The game begins on January 1, 1999, with the player choosing a location for their first base on the Geoscape screen: a global view representation of Earth as seen from space (displaying X-COM bases and aircraft, detected UFOs, alien bases, and sites of alien activity). The player can view the X-COM bases and make changes to them, equip fighter aircraft, order supplies and personnel (soldiers, scientists and engineers), direct research efforts, schedule manufacturing of advanced equipment, sell alien artifacts on black market to raise money, and deploy X-COM aircraft to either patrol designated locations, intercept UFOs, or send X-COM ground troops on missions using transport aircraft.

Funding is provided by the 16 founding nations of X-COM. At the end of each month, a funding report is provided, where nations can choose to increase or decrease their level of funding based on their perceived progress of the X-COM project. Any of these nations may quit if the nation's government has been infiltrated by the invaders. Through reverse engineering of recovered alien artifacts, X-COM is able to develop better technology to combat the alien menace and eventually uncover how to defeat it.

Battlescape

Gameplay switches to the tactical combat phase whenever X-COM ground forces come in contact with aliens.

One of three mission outcomes is possible: either the human forces are eliminated, the alien forces are neutralized, or the player chooses to withdraw. The mission's score and the result are based on the number of X-COM operatives lost (either dead, unconscious, or under alien control), civilians saved or perished, aliens killed or captured, and the number and quality of alien artifacts obtained. Troops may also increase in rank or abilities if they made successful use of their primary attributes (e.g. killing enemies). Instead of gaining experience points, surviving human combatants might get an automatic rise (a semi-random amount depending on how much of the action in which they participated) to their attributes, such as Psi or Accuracy. The soldiers who have been killed on a mission will remain dead, but can be replaced with raw recruits back at base. In addition to combat personnel, the player may use unmanned ground vehicles that are outfitted with heavy weapons and well armored but large, costly, and not gaining experience. Recovered alien artifacts can then be researched and possibly reproduced. Captured live aliens may produce information, possibly leading to new technologies and even an access to psionic warfare.

One reason for the game's success is the strong sense of atmosphere it evokes. Soldiers are vulnerable to alien attacks even when armored (a single shot from an alien has a good chance of bringing a soldier in perfect condition to death), and the use of features such as night-time combat, a line of sight, and opportunity fire allows for alien sniper attacks and ambushes. The enemy comes in numerous forms, and the players that are new to the game will run into new kinds of aliens without any knowledge of their characteristics and capabilities beforehand. The course of skirmishes is also dictated by the individual morale levels of their participants on both sides; a low morale can result in them either dropping their weapons and fleeing in panic or going berserk and opening fire indiscriminately.

Fan-created content
Fan-made patches fix a notorious bug which results in the game always resetting to the easiest difficulty level ("Beginner") after completing the first Battlescape mission, no matter what difficulty level has been selected. This glitch was not noticed by MicroProse and was not fixed in the official patches, resulting in the very high difficulty of the sequel due to many complaints from veteran players who believed that the original game was still too easy even on seemingly higher levels. The original release also contained many other bugs such as civilians appearing in inappropriate places, units being placed outside of the playable map area, and players being assigned alien and civilian units as playable.  IBM Master Inventor Scott T. Jones' noted 1995 patch-turned-mod, named XComUtil, fixes it as well as addressing many interface problems and better balancing the game; in 2010, a task of its further development was given to David Jones. 

OpenXcom is an open-source reimplementation of that game to fix all the known bugs and limits, improve the AI and user interface, localize in more languages, and to provide cross-platform builds, e.g. for Linux and Android. The second focus of OpenXcom is to enable customizing, modding and expansions like the notable total conversion X-Piratez.

Development
The game was originally conceived by a small British video game developer company, Mythos Games – led by Julian Gollop – as a sequel to their 1988 science fiction tactical game Laser Squad, "but with much neater graphics using an isometric style very similar to Populous." The initial 1991 demo presented a relatively simple, two-player tactical game then known as Laser Squad 2 (or Laser Squad II), which ran on the Atari ST. The Gollop brothers (Julian and Nick) approached three video game publishers, Krisalis, Domark and MicroProse, eventually brokering a deal with MicroProse. Julian Gollop was especially happy about it because he greatly respected MicroProse and believed it was probably the best video game company in the world at the time.

Although supportive of the project, the publisher expressed concerns that the demo lacked a grand scale in keeping with MicroProse's hit strategy game Civilization. The Civilopedia feature of Civilization also inspired an addition of the in-game encyclopedia, called the UFOpaedia. All that and the UFO theme was suggested by MicroProse UK head of development Pete Moreland. Julian Gollop's personal inspirations included several traditional games, in particular, the board wargame Sniper! and the tabletop role-playing game Traveller.

Under MicroProse's direction and working at its Chipping Sodbury studio, Julian Gollop said that while the research and technology tree somewhat emulates the role of advances in Civilization, "it also helped to develop the storyline." He changed the setting to modern-day Earth and expanded the strategy elements, among them the ability to capture and reproduce alien technology. He has cited the 1970s British television series UFO as one of the influences for the game's storyline, in particular, an idea of an international counter-UFO organization and the psionic powers of some alien races, even as the series itself was "a bit boring". A book by Bob Lazar, where he describes his supposed work with recovered UFOs at Area 51, inspired the concept to reverse-engineer captured alien technology. Timothy Good's 1991 book Alien Liaison provided inspiration for several of Julian Gollop's revisions, such as the notion that world governments might seize alien technology or secretly conspire with the invaders (a negative result which can occur in-game). Inspirations also included Whitley Strieber's book Communion and other "weird American stories".

MicroProse UK graphics artists John Reitze and Martin Smillie provided what MicroProse described as "popular 'manga' look and feel" visuals. Julian Gollop credited Reitze with "a distinctive comic book style" and Smillie with "very detailed environment graphics". John Broomhall composed the music while Andrew Parton handled the sound effects. There were also major contributors who were not acknowledged in the game's credits, such as the designer Steve Hand, a Laser Squad fan who helped the project get signed, put input into the "big game" concept, actually came up with the name X-COM (derived from Mike Brunton's initial idea of X-CON, where "CON" originally stood for "contact"), and helped to define the comic book-like art style. Hand thought the original design document was poorly written, especially regarding the initial, more interactive and action-oriented UFO interception system; nevertheless, the final game turned out to be very close to it. Certain creature types deemed "boring" were removed during the development, as were the Men in Black, who were unused due to a perceived conflict with MicroProse's abortive project to make an MIB-themed standalone game.

A public demo of the game was released under the North American version's working title X-COM: Terran Defense Force. Despite numerous changes from the first demo, the tactical part of the game remains true to the turn-based layout of Laser Squad and the Gollop brothers' earlier Rebelstar series. The AI system of those games formed the basis for enemy tactics, with Julian Gollop programming his own unique algorithms for pathfinding and behavior; in particular, the aliens were purposely given an element of unpredictability in their actions. It was the first game programmed by them for the PC. In retrospect, Julian thought he should have concentrated on game design and left all of the programming work to Nick. Producer Tim Roberts was described by him positively as "very laid back" and for most of the time allowed them to work on the game without any interference and schedules, only checking in once in a month to conduct meetings in a pub.

The original contract was for the game be completed within 18 months. In the course of its development, the game was nearly canceled twice: in the first instance due to the company's financial difficulties, and the second time under the pressure from Spectrum HoloByte after it had acquired Bill Stealey’s shares in MicroProse in 1993. Julian Gollop said the quality assurance team (Andrew Lucket, Phil McDonnel, and Jason Thompson) helped save the game from cancellation; their feedback also helped to polish the game. The game was in fact officially ordered to be canceled by Spectrum HoloByte, but MicroProse UK bosses Pete Moreland, Adrian Parr, and Paul Hibbard held a meeting and decided to ignore it and simply not inform Gollop about any of that. Thus, the development team continued their work without any knowledge of the parent company's executives, until it was eventually completed in March 1994, after 30 months in development since the initial contract. During the final three months, after Spectrum HoloByte was eventually informed of the game still being in production, the Gollop brothers were forced to work 7–12 in order to finish it before the end of the fiscal year. The overall development of the PC version cost £115,000.

Release
The finished product was marketed as UFO: Enemy Unknown in Europe, Quebec and Australia and as X-COM: UFO Defense in North America. The latter features a different box cover, faithful to the game's contents (the original cover of UFO: Enemy Unknown depicts the aliens and their spacecraft design that are unlike anything actually seen in the game) and its cartoonish art style.

Ports and re-releases
The Amiga conversion was done by Julian Gollop's brother Nick and "it was quite tough because the Amiga wasn’t quite as fast as PCs were becoming at that time." The Amiga ECS/OCS version displays lower quality graphics than the PC version and is missing light source shading during combat missions, but the sound quality is improved; the graphics are better in the AGA Amiga version. A Limited Edition for the Amiga CD32 came with a MicroProse travel alarm clock.

The 1995 PlayStation port has retained the original graphics due to time restraints (adding only some 3D models as illustrations for the UFOpaedia) but features much higher quality music than the PC version (55 minutes of CD-quality tracks and 8 minutes of 16-bit tracks instead of the 8-bit MIDI music). The new music was composed by Allister Brimble, who later also created the music for the first sequel, X-COM: Terror from the Deep. It is compatible with the highly recommended PlayStation Mouse and requires five PlayStation memory card blocks for a Battlescape saved game.

The game was re-released as part of the compilations X-COM: Unknown Terror by MicroProse and Prima Games in 1996, X-COM (Collector's Edition) by MicroProse in 1998, X-COM Collection by Hasbro Interactive in 1999, X-COM: Complete Pack by 2K Games in 2008 and 2K Huge Games Pack in 2009, as well as in the "Classic Games Collection" CD featured with the July 2000 issue of PC Gamer. In X-COM: Complete Pack (also known as X-COM Collection), all five X-COM games were released for paid download on Steam with added Windows XP and Windows Vista support.

Novelizations
Diane Duane's 1995 X-COM: UFO Defense – A Novel tells the story of Jonelle Barrett, commander of X-COM's newly established Swiss base. According to Rock, Paper, Shotgun's negative review of Duane's novel, it is hampered by a poor understanding of the game, a lack of focus, emotional resonance and tension, and an unstructured plot.

Another novelization of the game, Враг неизвестен ("Enemy Unknown") written by Vladimir Vasilyev, was published in Russia in 1997. The book tells the story of one of the original eight X-COM troops from beginning of the conflict to the final raid on Cydonia.

Reception

The game was released to very positive reviews and commercial success, selling more than 600,000 units on the PC DOS platform, not counting the later ports—for the Amiga platforms and the PlayStation—and re-releases. Half of the game's net sales were in the United States, a rarity for a European title at the time. Gollop has attributed the game's North American success to its title (X-COM), as the television series The X-Files had premiered a year earlier. More than 400,000 units were sold at full price, with little marketing from its publisher. Together with its sequel, X-COM: Terror from the Deep, its sales had passed 1 million copies by March 1997. The game earned the Gollop brothers just over £1 million in royalties. The game became very popular also in Russia, even as there were no royalties from that market as it was only distributed there via software piracy.

Computer Gaming World rated X-COM five stars out of five. Describing it as "one of those rare and dangerous games capable of drilling into your brain, putting a vice-grip on your imagination, and only releasing you when it has had enough", the magazine praised its detailed and varied combat system and lengthy gameplay, concluding "Resistance is futile". A preview of the PlayStation version in Next Generation called it "one of the best PC strategy games ever". GameSpot said, "put simply, X-COM is a bona fide modern classic, standing proudly alongside Civilization and Populous as a benchmark in the evolution of strategy gaming". Electronic Gaming Monthly stated of the PlayStation version that "any person who likes strategy games will fall in love with this title ... if you could afford to buy one game for the PS over the next year, X-COM would be it. It has it all and then some!" A reviewer for Next Generation criticized the PlayStation version for being little more than a straight port, arguing that the game could have been improved if the console's capabilities were used. However, he praised the game itself for sophisticated, enjoyable gameplay, and concluded, "X-COM was a smashing PC title, it's lost nothing of practical value in the translation, and makes a marvelous addition to the console market". GamePro disagreed: "You have to be a major sim-freak to enjoy X-COM. It's an interesting and complex game about planet colonizing, but the extensive manuals and one-dimensional music really bore you to alien tears after a while".

Amiga ports received lower ratings than the PC original (which holds an average score of 93.60% at GameRankings), according to Amiga HOL database having averaged scores of 79% on the ECS/OCS Amigas, 82% on the AGA Amigas and 73% for the Amiga CD32 version. A common point of criticism for the floppy disk version was the need to frequently swap the disks in the Amiga systems not equipped with a hard disk drive, while the CD-ROM based CD32 version does not allow the users to save the progress of any other game without wiping out the save game of UFO. Nevertheless, a review in Amiga Action called it "easily the most original and innovative game in the history of the Amiga", a review in Amiga World called in "the shortest path to heaven" for a strategy gamer, and a review in CU Amiga of the 1997 budget range re-release called it the "game everyone loves".

Computer Gaming World gave X-COM its Game of the Year award. PC Gamer US presented UFO Defense with its 1994 "Best Strategy Game" award. The editors wrote, "X-COMs classic mix of action and strategy will have you hooked for hours, and made this one of the finest games of the year."

Retrospective
In 2009, Edge called X-COM "the title that first brought turn-based wargaming to the masses." It has often appeared in top video game lists by various publications. Computer Gaming World  ranked it as the 22nd (1996) and third (2001) best computer game of all time; the magazine's readers also voted it for tenth place in 2001. It was ranked as the 26th top game of all time by Next Generation in 1996 ("breathed new live into turn-based strategy genre"), the 35th best video game of all time by GameSpy in 2001 ("stellar game design can withstand the test of time"), as the second best video game since 1992 by Finnish magazine Pelit in 2007, and as the 78th best video game "to play today" by Edge in 2009. Polish web portal Wirtualna Polska ranked it as the 13th best Amiga game, as well as the third most addictive game "that stole our childhood"; it was also retrospectively ranked as the eighth best Amiga game by the Polish edition of CHIP. In 1999, Next Generation listed X-Com UFO Defense as number 37 on their "Top 50 Games of All Time", commenting that, "X-COM revamp the turn-based subgenre by strengthening the resource management elements and adding highly intuitive interface." In 2015, Rock, Paper, Shotgun listed it as their 6th "Best Strategy Games Ever Made" ("in the thick of a terror mission, with chrysalids seeming to pour out of the walls, or in those last hours when you finally seem capable of taking the fight to the aliens, there’s nothing else quite like X-COM") In 1996, GamesMaster ranked the game 48th on their "Top 100 Games of All Time."

IGN named it as the number one top PC game of all time in 2000 ("the finest PC game we have ever played") and 2007 ("there's still no PC game that can compete with the mighty X-COM"), as well as ranking it as the second top "modern PC game" in 2009. IGN also included it on several lists of the best video games of all time on all platforms, including it at eighth place in 2003 ("a game that will live on in the annals of computer gaming history"), at 12th place in 2005 ("for us 1994 will always be remembered as the year of X-COM"), and at 21st place in 2007 ("one of the most memorable and perfectly executed strategy games ever seen"). PC Gamer ranked it as the seventh (1997), eighth (1998), third (2001), eighth (2005), tenth (in both 2007 and 2008, as a "truly groundbreaking game" that "still plays fresher than almost anything else that begs passage through these pages"), 11th (2010, the editors adding that everyone who would not vote for this game is "dead" to them) and 12th (2011, describing it as a "brilliant game whose individual elements have been copied many times but whose charm has never been duplicated") best PC game of all time; it was also voted at 15th place by the magazine's readers in 2000.

It was also inducted into several halls of fame, including by CGW in 2005 ("a great game which proves that pushing the technological envelope is often less important than stoking the gamer's competitive fire"), by GameSpot in 2003 (featured among The Greatest Games of All Time as "one of the defining games of the turn-based strategy genre"), and by IGN in 2007 ("if this game were a woman, we'd marry it"). In 1996, CGW ranked it as the number one sleeper hit of all time. In 1999, the game's Xenomorph-inspired alien race of Chryssalids was ranked as fourth on the list of best monsters in gaming by GameSpot, where X-COM was also called "one of the scariest computer games ever". In 2012, while awaiting the remake, The Escapist ran a feature article about "why X-COM is the greatest game ever" and game designer Ken Levine named it as one of his all-time personal favorites. That same year, 1UP.com ranked it as the 90th most essential game of all time, commenting that "with its unrivaled balance of tactics and tension, XCOM remains a masterpiece."

Legacy

The success of the game resulted in several sequels and spin-off games, as well as many unofficial remake and spiritual successor titles, both fan-made and commercial. Julian Gollop himself designed the third game in the X-COM series, 1997's X-COM: Apocalypse, which was also developed together by Mythos Games and MicroProse. The game also received an unofficial sequel in the 1997 expansion set Civ II: Fantastic Worlds for MicroProse's Civilization II, in a scenario set on the Phobos moon of Mars.

An official remake, titled XCOM: Enemy Unknown, was developed by Firaxis Games, led by MicroProse's co-founder Sid Meier. The game's prototype was actually a modernization of the original, with all the classic gameplay features, but then gradually evolved into a completely "reimagined" version. The game was released by 2K Games for Microsoft Windows, PlayStation 3 and Xbox 360 in October 2012, winning multiple Game of the Year awards. In a retrospective article in Eurogamer, Alec Meer compared both games with "a sort of objectivity from me that hasn't been remotely possible over the last two decades of worshipping at its VGA shrine," stating: "I can see a game that can and will co-exist with rather than be supplanted by its remake. X-COM and XCOM are completely different games, both ingenious and both flawed in their own ways. I'd kill for a hybrid of the two, but having two rather than one sure is nothing to sniff at." In a positive review of the remake, Dan Stapleton of GameSpy added: "I leave the title of Best Game Ever with the original." Julian Gollop himself commented that "Firaxis did a terrific job with the new XCOM," although he "would have done things differently for sure. (...) I tried many times for many years to get a remake underway, but Firaxis finally did it. Also, there is a promising and more faithful remake called Xenonauts."

The game also had a big influence on the development team of the role-playing video game Fallout. Project director Tim Cain said they "all loved X-COM" and that the original version of Fallout (known as Vault 13, before the game was redesigned after they lost the GURPS license) had a very similar combat system.

References

External links
  (MicroProse) (archived)
  (Mythos Games) (archived)
 
 UFOPaedia, an extensive wiki containing information, analysis, strategy, and other resources for Enemy Unknown and other X-COM games

1994 video games
Alien invasions in video games
Amiga 1200 games
Amiga CD32 games
Amiga games
Construction and management simulation games
DOS games
Games commercially released with DOSBox
MicroProse games
PlayStation (console) games
Science fiction video games
Single-player video games
Strategy video games
Turn-based tactics video games
Video games adapted into novels
Video games developed in the United Kingdom
Video games scored by Allister Brimble
Video games scored by John Broomhall
Video games set in the 1990s
Video games with alternate endings
Video games with isometric graphics
Windows games
XCOM
Mythos Games games